David Dunlap may refer to:

 David Dunlap (lobbyist), for Harsco Corporation, and EPA official; 
 David Dunlap (rower), American Olympic rower;
 David L. Dunlap, American football player and coach;
 David W. Dunlap, American reporter
 David Alexander Dunlap, Canadian lawyer, mining executive and philanthropist